Maryland basketball may refer to any of the following teams:

Men's teams 
 Maryland Terrapins men's basketball
 UMBC Retrievers men's basketball
 University of Maryland Eastern Shore

Women's teams
 Maryland Terrapins women's basketball
 UMBC Retrievers women's basketball
 University of Maryland Eastern Shore